Mohamed Abdelaziz Tchikou (born 14 December 1985) is an Algerian professional football player who currently plays as a forward for Algerian Algerian Ligue Professionnelle 2 club USM Blida.

Club career

Olympique de Médéa
Tchikou signed in the summer of 2010 for Olympique de Médéa scoring his first goal for the club on 15 October 2010 against SA Mohammadia in the 10th minute of the game. On 10 December 2010, Tchikou scored his second league goal for the club against ES Mostaganem in the forty-third minute of the game.

Statistics

Honours
 Finalist of the Algerian Cup once with CA Batna in 2010

References

External links

Mohamed Abdelaziz Tchikou profile at dzfoot.com

1985 births
Living people
Algerian footballers
JS Kabylie players
CA Batna players
Olympique de Médéa players
RC Kouba players
JS Saoura players
Algerian Ligue 2 players
NARB Réghaïa players
Association football forwards
21st-century Algerian people